Qurichai (also Romanized as Qūrīchā’ī and Qūrī Chāy; also known as Quruchāi) is a village in the Sarab Rural District, which is located in the Central District of Sonqor County, Kermanshah Province, Iran. At the 2006 census, its population was 186, in 43 families.

References 

Populated places in Sonqor County